Top-seeded Andrés Gómez defeated Balázs Taróczy in the final to claim the title and $51,000 prize money.

Seeds
The top eight seeds received a bye into the second round. A champion seed is indicated in bold text while text in italics indicates the round in which that seed was eliminated.

  Andrés Gómez (champion)
  Henrik Sundström (second round)
  Tomáš Šmíd (second round)
  Aaron Krickstein (third round)
  Juan Aguilera (third round)
  Joakim Nyström (third round)
  José Higueras (third round)
  Guillermo Vilas (third round)
  Mel Purcell (second round)
  Heinz Günthardt (semifinals)
  Diego Pérez (first round)
  Pablo Arraya (quarterfinals)
  Brad Gilbert (second round)
  Francesco Cancellotti (second round)
  Mark Dickson (third round)
  Libor Pimek (semifinals)

Draw

Finals

Top half

Section 1

Section 2

Bottom half

Section 3

Section 4

References

External links

1984 Grand Prix (tennis)
Men's Singles